The Life of the Party is the seventh studio album by American country music artist Neal McCoy. Released in 1999, it contains the singles "I Was" and "The Girls of Summer", which peaked at #37 and #42, respectively, on the Billboard Hot Country Singles & Tracks (now Hot Country Songs) charts that year. "Straighten up and Fly Right" is a cover of a Nat King Cole song.

Track listing

Personnel
Mark Casstevens – acoustic guitar
Thom Flora – background vocals
Paul Franklin – steel guitar
Sonny Garrish – steel guitar
Jim Horn – saxophone
John Barlow Jarvis – keyboards
Paul Leim – drums
Brent Mason – electric guitar
Neal McCoy- lead vocals 
Gene Miller – background vocals
Steve Nathan – keyboards
Donny Parenteau – fiddle
Michael Rhodes – bass guitar
Tom Roady – percussion
Chris Rodriguez – background vocals
Harry Stinson – background vocals
Billy Joe Walker, Jr. – six string electric bass
Dennis Wilson – background vocals
Glenn Worf – bass guitar
Curtis Young – background vocals

Chart performance

1999 albums
Atlantic Records albums
Neal McCoy albums
Albums produced by Kyle Lehning